Jake Mario Jervis (born 17 September 1991) is an English professional footballer who plays as a winger or striker for Indian Super League club East Bengal.

Jervis made his first-team debut for Birmingham City in the FA Cup in January 2010, first appeared in the Football League while on loan to Hereford United in March 2010, and has also played on loan at Notts County, Swindon Town, Preston North End, Carlisle United, Tranmere Rovers and Portsmouth. He spent six months with Turkish Süper Lig club Elazığspor in 2013, rejoined Portsmouth in 2014, and then spent a season in Scotland with Ross County. He spent the longest spell of his senior career, of two-and-a-half seasons, with Plymouth Argyle before signing for Luton Town in January 2018. After spells on loan at AFC Wimbledon and Salford City, he signed for Finnish club SJK in 2020. After playing two years there, he signed for Indian club East Bengal in 2023.

Club career

Early career

Jervis began his football career as a youngster with Wolverhampton Wanderers, moving on to Shrewsbury Town as a 12-year-old. After three years with Shrewsbury, Jervis joined Birmingham City's Academy. In 2008, he was a second-half substitute as a mixture of senior and reserve players won the Birmingham Senior Cup, and in 2009 he helped the academy team reach the semi-final of the FA Youth Cup.

Birmingham City

2009–10 season
Following three goals in three matches for the reserves, Jervis made his first-team debut on 23 January 2010, coming on as a substitute for Christian Benítez in the FA Cup against Everton at Goodison Park. He played the last 11 minutes as Birmingham protected a 2–1 lead. He later described his debut as "the best experience I've had so far in football".

In March 2010, Jervis signed his first professional contract, of two-and-a-half years. The following week, Jervis joined League Two club Hereford United on a one-month youth loan, to gain experience of first-team football. Despite signing too late to train with his new teammates before the League match against Bradford City on 20 March, he was included among the substitutes. He came into the match in the 70th minute, and scored the second goal of a 2–0 win; according to the club's website, "his first touch controlled the ball well and the second saw him lift the ball over the onrushing [goalkeeper]". He scored with a penalty kick in his second appearance, a 2–1 victory at Chesterfield, and returned to Birmingham at the end of his one-month loan having started five matches and appeared twice as a substitute.

2010–11 season
Prior to the start of the 2010–11 season, Jervis joined Notts County, newly promoted to League One, on loan until January 2011. Jervis played regularly at the beginning of his loan spell, though usually as substitute, but made only one brief first-team appearance after Paul Ince took over as manager at the end of October. In January 2011, Jervis returned to Hereford United on a one-month youth loan but he returned after the loan was not extended.

2011–12 season
In the absence through injury of strikers Cameron Jerome, Marlon King and Nikola Žigić, Jervis was named in the 20-man squad for Birmingham's Europa League match against Nacional in Madeira in August. An unused substitute in the first leg, he made a brief appearance in the second leg, replacing Chris Wood in the 89th minute as Birmingham won 3–0 to qualify for the group stage.

On 29 September, Jervis joined Swindon Town of League Two on loan for a month. He made his debut the following day, replacing Mehdi Kerrouche after an hour as Swindon lost 2–0 away at Macclesfield Town. Jervis scored two goals, one from close range and the second after dispossessing goalkeeper Artur Krysiak – a former teammate at Birmingham – as Swindon beat Exeter City 2–1 to progress to the area quarter-finals of the Football League Trophy. The loan was extended until 30 December, and Jervis returned to Birmingham having made 14 appearances and scored 5 goals in all competitions.

On 1 January 2012, Jervis joined Preston North End of League One on a 28-day youth loan. He went straight into the starting eleven for their match the following day, and scored the opening goal as Preston drew 1–1 away to Rochdale. He returned to Birmingham at the end of the month having scored twice from five appearances.

Jervis was a 71st-minute substitute, replacing Adam Rooney, as Birmingham drew 1–1 away to Chelsea in the fifth round of the FA Cup. He signed a one-year contract extension at the end of the season.

2012–13 season
On 22 August, Jervis joined Carlisle United of League One on loan for a month. He made his debut three days later and scored as Carlisle beat Portsmouth 4–2. He missed his penalty in the shootout against Preston North End as Carlisle were eliminated from the Football League Trophy, and the next weekend missed an open goal against Hartlepool United, although Carlisle still won the match. Two first-half goals against Swindon Town meant he returned to Birmingham having scored three times in five league matches.

With their top scorer Jean-Louis Akpa Akpro out injured for three months, League One leaders Tranmere Rovers signed Jervis on loan in time for him to make another goal-scoring debut as his new club lost 3–1 at AFC Bournemouth on 20 October. He damaged an ankle during the match, so missed two weeks of his loan spell, making four more appearances without scoring. Within days of his return to Birmingham, he moved to another League One club, Portsmouth, on a one-month loan. He scored once in three appearances before the loan was extended until 4 January 2013, but two days later he was recalled after injuries to Marlon King and Peter Løvenkrands left Birmingham with Nikola Žigić as their only fit senior striker. He made his first league appearance for Birmingham on 29 December, replacing Callum Reilly shortly after Bolton Wanderers took a 3–1 lead.

Elazıgspor
Jervis moved abroad for the first time, joining Elazığspor, near the bottom of the Turkish Süper Lig, in January 2013 for a fee reported as €50,000. He signed a three-and-a-half-year contract. Included in the starting eleven for the away match against Fenerbahçe on 20 January, Jervis opened the scoring with an 11th-minute header. The match finished 2–2, as Fenerbahçe equalised in the third minute of stoppage time. After three matches he broke his foot, and played only one more league match. After the club defaulted on his wages, his contract was cancelled in September 2013.

Portsmouth
He trained with Sheffield United, Coventry City, and with his former club Portsmouth. They and Sheffield United wanted to sign him, but his age meant that any new club would be liable for training and development compensation unless this were waived by his previous club. In addition, a FIFA investigation concluded he had still been registered with Elazığspor when the transfer window closed, so was unable to sign for another club until the next window, in January 2014. On 9 January, he signed for Portsmouth until the end of the season.

Ross County
On 7 June 2014, Jervis signed for Ross County. He scored on his debut against St Johnstone in a 2–1 defeat.

Plymouth Argyle
On 29 June 2015, Jervis agreed a one-year contract with League Two club Plymouth Argyle, linking up again with manager Derek Adams who had signed him for Ross County. He scored his first goal for Plymouth in a 4–1 win over Carlisle United on 18 August 2015. Jervis scored 13 goals in 49 appearances as Plymouth were promoted to League One after finishing second in League Two in 2016–17.

Luton Town
Jervis signed a two-and-a-half-year deal with another League Two club, Luton Town, on 31 January 2018; the fee was undisclosed. He joined Luton's League One rivals AFC Wimbledon on 31 August 2018 on a season-long loan. Jervis was loaned out again on 2 September 2019, joining League Two club Salford City until the end of the 2019–20 season.

On 19 August 2020, Jervis joined Veikkausliiga side SJK on a deal until the end of the season. In November 2020, he extended his contract with the Finnish club until the end of the 2022 season.

Personal life
Jervis was born in Wolverhampton and brought up in Telford.

Career statistics

Honours

Birmingham City
Birmingham Senior Cup: 2007–08

Plymouth Argyle
EFL League Two runner-up: 2016–17

Luton Town
EFL League Two runner-up: 2017–18

References

External links

Jake Jervis profile at the Luton Town F.C. website

1991 births
Living people
Footballers from Wolverhampton
People from Telford
English footballers
Association football forwards
Birmingham City F.C. players
Hereford United F.C. players
Notts County F.C. players
Swindon Town F.C. players
Preston North End F.C. players
Carlisle United F.C. players
Tranmere Rovers F.C. players
Elazığspor footballers
Portsmouth F.C. players
Ross County F.C. players
Plymouth Argyle F.C. players
Luton Town F.C. players
AFC Wimbledon players
Salford City F.C. players
Seinäjoen Jalkapallokerho players
English Football League players
Süper Lig players
Scottish Professional Football League players
Veikkausliiga players
English expatriate footballers
Expatriate footballers in Turkey
English expatriate sportspeople in Turkey
Expatriate footballers in Finland
English expatriate sportspeople in Finland
Black British sportspeople